Bump is an Australian streaming television comedy-drama series created by Claudia Karvan and Kelsey Munro which premiered on Stan on 1 January 2021. Set in and around a high school in the Inner West of Sydney, the series centres around Oly, an ambitious and high-achieving teenage girl who has a surprise baby and the complications that ensue for two families. The ten-part series was produced by Roadshow Rough Diamond.

Season two premiered on 26 December 2021 and season three premiered on 26 December 2022.

Cast
 Claudia Karvan as Angie Davis
 Nathalie Morris as Olympia 'Oly' Davis-Chalmers
 Carlos Sanson Jnr as Santiago 'Santi' Hernández
 Angus Sampson as Dom Chalmers
 Ava Cannon as Jacinda Hernandez Davis Chalmers
 Catalina Palma Godoy as Ángel
 Safia Arain as Reema
 Paula García as Rosa Hernández
 Ioane Saula as Vince Ingram
 Peter Thurnwald as Lachie Koh
 Ricardo Scheihing Vásquez as Matías Hernández
 Roman Delo as Zac Russo
 Sarah Meacham as Madison
 Claudia de Giusti as Bernadita Hernández
 Miguel Andrade as Alejandro

Episodes

Series Overview

Season 1 (2021)

Season 2 (2021)

Season 3 (2022)

Production
The series was co-created by Claudia Karvan and Kelsey Munro, who also co-wrote with a writing team of Jessica Tuckwell, Timothy Lee, Mithila Gupta and Steven Arriagada. Karvan produced along with John Edwards and  Dan Edwards. Geoff Bennett, Gracie Otto and Leticia Cáceres directed the series.

In January 2021 the series was renewed for a second  season. In July it was confirmed that production on season 2 was underway in Sydney and that a third season had also been confirmed. On 25 November 2021 a trailer for season 2 was released along with an announcement that the season was scheduled to be released on 26 December 2021.

The school scenes are filmed on and around Sydney Secondary College Blackwattle Bay Campus.

International broadcasts 
On 18 June 2021, Canada's CBC premiered the first season of Bump on its CBC Gem streaming service, adding the second season on 29 July 2022. In the United Kingdom, the series began airing on BBC One on 20 October 2021, and also was made available on the BBC iPlayer streaming service. The second season debuted on 17 June 2022.

In March 2022, the series was picked by The CW in the United States, and it premiered on 11 August 2022.

References

External links
 
 

2021 Australian television series debuts
2020s Australian comedy television series
2020s Australian drama television series
2020s teen drama television series
Australian comedy-drama television series
English-language television shows
Television series about teenagers
Television shows set in New South Wales
Television shows set in Sydney
Stan (service) original programming
Teenage pregnancy in television